is a Japanese professional footballer who plays as a midfielder for Kyoto Sanga in the J2 League.

Club career
Takeda marked his professional debut with a 51st-minute goal against Oita Trinita in a 1–1 draw on 28 May 2017.

Career statistics

Club

Notes

References

External links

1994 births
Living people
Association football people from Kanagawa Prefecture
Kanagawa University alumni
Japanese footballers
Association football midfielders
Fagiano Okayama players
Ventforet Kofu players
Kyoto Sanga FC players
J2 League players